Agus Durmaturia (born August 14, 1992) is an Indonesian footballer that currently plays for Perseru Serui in the Indonesia Super League.

References

External links
Agus Hendrawan Durmaturia at Liga Indonesia

1992 births
Living people
Indonesian footballers
Liga 1 (Indonesia) players
Persiwa Wamena players
Association football defenders
People from Wamena